Margolus is a surname that, like its variants shown below, is derived from the Ashkenazi Hebrew pronunciation of the Hebrew word  (Israeli Hebrew [maɹgalit]), meaning 'pearl,' and may refer to:

Norman Margolus, Canadian-American physicist and computer scientist

See also 
 Margolis
 Margolies
 Margules
 Margulies
 Margulis
 Margolin
 Miriam Margolyes
 Margolius 

Jewish surnames
Hebrew-language surnames